Afrasura fracta is a moth of the subfamily Arctiinae. It was described by Antonio Durante in 2012 and is endemic to Gabon.

References

External links

Moths described in 2012
Endemic fauna of Gabon
fracta
Moths of Africa